Jake Chelios (born March 8, 1991), also known as Jieke Kailiaosi, is an American-born professional ice hockey defenseman who is currently playing in China for Kunlun Red Star in the Kontinental Hockey League (KHL). Born in the United States, he represented China at the 2022 Winter Olympics. He previously played with the Detroit Red Wings of the National Hockey League (NHL).

Playing career
Chelios played with the Detroit Red Wings through to the under-18 level in the T1EHL. He later moved on to play junior hockey with the Chicago Steel in the United States Hockey League (USHL). He committed to play collegiate hockey with Michigan State University in the Big Ten Conference.

Undrafted, Chelios made his professional debut following his senior year in 2013–14, playing alongside brother Dean with the Toledo Walleye of the ECHL before joining the Chicago Wolves of the AHL.

After posting a breakout season in the 2015–16 campaign in scoring 31 points in 73 games with the Charlotte Checkers, Chelios was signed to his first NHL contract with parent affiliate, the Carolina Hurricanes on April 22, 2016. He re-signed with Carolina on June 27, 2017.

On July 1, 2018, the Detroit Red Wings signed Chelios to a one-year, two-way contract. On March 29, 2019, the Red Wings recalled Chelios from the Grand Rapids Griffins under emergency conditions. Before being recalled, he recorded one goal and 13 assists in 59 games for the Griffins. He made his NHL debut later that same day in a game against the New Jersey Devils. Upon making his debut, he became the sixth father-son combination in Red Wings history, joining Sid and Gerry Abel, Adam and Andy Brown, Bill and Peter Dineen, Gordie and Mark Howe, and Jimmy Peters Sr. and Jimmy Peters Jr. Chelios played out the season with the Red Wings, going scoreless in 5 games, before he was returned to Grand Rapids for the playoffs.

Chelios embarked on a career abroad as an impending free agent, agreeing to a two-year contract with Chinese-based KHL club, Kunlun Red Star, on May 23, 2019.

International play
Due to his stint in China, Chelios was called up to represent the China men's national ice hockey team for the 2022 Winter Olympics, under the name Jieke Kailiaosi. He became a Chinese citizen in order to be eligible to represent the nation at the Olympics. While confirming that he kept his American citizenship, Chelios denied answering whether he naturalized as a Chinese citizen. While the Olympic Charter stipulates that any athlete competing in the Games must be a national of the country of the NOC which is entering such competitor, the IOC Executive Board has the authority to make certain exceptions of a "general or individual nature", though it is unclear whether this was the case.

Personal
Chelios is the son of NHL Hall of Famer Chris Chelios. Chelios has an older brother, Dean, and two younger sisters, Tara and Caley.

Career statistics

Regular season and playoffs

International

Awards and honors

References

External links
 

1991 births
Living people
Chinese ice hockey defencemen
Olympic ice hockey players of China
American men's ice hockey defensemen
American emigrants to China
American people of Greek descent
Chinese people of Greek descent
Naturalized citizens of the People's Republic of China
Charlotte Checkers (2010–) players
Chicago Steel players
Chicago Wolves players
Detroit Red Wings players
Grand Rapids Griffins players
Ice hockey people from Chicago
Kalamazoo Wings (ECHL) players
HC Kunlun Red Star players
Michigan State Spartans men's ice hockey players
Toledo Walleye players
Undrafted National Hockey League players
American expatriate ice hockey players in China
Ice hockey players at the 2022 Winter Olympics